The Carl Hermann Medal is the highest award in the field of crystallography from the German Crystallographic Society. It is named after the German physicist and professor of crystallography Carl Hermann, who along with Paul Peter Ewald, created the Strukturbericht designation system for crystallographic prototypes. The medal is awarded annually during the annual meeting of the society

Carl Hermann Medal recipients 
 1996 Gerhard Borrmann
 1997 Hartmut Bärnighausen
 1998 Siegfried Haussühl
 1999 George Sheldrick
 2000 Heinz Jagodzinski
 2001 Theo Hahn, Hans Wondratschek
 2002 Friedrich Liebau
 2003 Hans-Joachim Bunge
 2004 Wolfram Saenger
 2005 Peter Paufler
 2006 Werner Fischer
 2008 Hans Burzlaff
 2009 Armin Kirfel
 2010 Wolfgang Jeitschko
 2011 Gernot Heger
 2013 Emil Makovicky
 2014 Axel T. Brünger
 2015 Peter Luger
 2016 Hartmut Fueß
 2017 Wolfgang Neumann
 2018 Walter Steurer
 2019 Georg E. Schulz
 2020 Dieter Fenske
 2021 Karl Fischer
 2022 Wulf Depmeier

References

External links 
 Recipients of the Carl Hermann Medal from the German Crystallographic Society

Awards established in 1996
Medals
Crystallography awards
German science and technology awards